The New Jersey Titans were a team of the Women's Spring Football League (WSFL) 11-woman division.  Originally based in Wayne, New Jersey, the Titans played their home games on the campus of Passaic County Technical Institute through their 2010 season. Upon their return for the 2012 season, the Titans relocated their home games to Belleville Municipal Stadium in Belleville, New Jersey.

Before joining the WSFL, the Titans played a season each in the Women's Professional Football League and the National Women's Football Association (both of which have since gone moribund), as well as two seasons in the Women's Football Alliance before taking the 2011 season off.

The team was featured on an episode of Style Network's reality show, Glam Fairy on January 8, 2012, called "Ghosts & Glamazons".

After winning the WSFL title in 2012, the New Jersey Titans has since stopped fielding a team.

Season-by-season

|-
| colspan="6" align="center" | New Jersey Titans (WPFL)
|-
|2007 || 4 || 2 || 0 || 2nd American East || —
|-
| colspan="6" align="center" | New Jersey Titans (NWFA)
|-
|2008 || 3 || 5 || 0 || 2nd North East || —
|-
| colspan="6" align="center" | New Jersey Titans (WFA)
|-
|2009 || 5 || 3 || 0 || 2nd National Northeast || —
|-
|2010 || 2 || 6 || 0 || 3rd National East || —
|-
|2011 || colspan="6" align="center" | Did not play
|-
| colspan="6" align="center" | New Jersey Titans (WSFL)
|-
|2012 || 8 || 1 || 0 || 1st Northeast || Won Northeast Division ChampionshipWon American Conference Championship     National Championship
|-
!Totals || 22 || 17 || 0
|colspan="2"|

Roster

Season schedules and scores

2009

2010

2012

** = Game won by forfeit

References

National Women's Football Association teams
Women's Spring Football League teams
Belleville, New Jersey
Wayne, New Jersey
American football teams in New Jersey
American football teams in the New York metropolitan area
American football teams established in 2007
2007 establishments in New Jersey
Women's sports in New Jersey